Cusher River is a river in County Armagh, Northern Ireland. It is formed by the junction, near Mountnorris, of two small streams (the Creggan and the Blackwater), flows by Tandragee, and joins the River Bann one mile above Portadown.

The Cusher River is part of the Newry Canal. Both of these waters and the Bann connect at Whitecoat.

History
During the 19th century, the Cusher River had various mills for food.

Pollution
In June 2008, river pollution killed many roachs and trout.

See also
 Rivers of Ireland
 List of rivers of Northern Ireland

References

External links
Geograph - Bridge over the River Cusher at Clare Photograph
Geograph - Cusher River, Loughgilly Photograph

Rivers of County Armagh